Aaron Benedict Gardenier (September 26, 1848 – June 18, 1909) was an American lawyer and politician from New York.

Life 
Gardenier was born on September 26, 1848, in Kinderhook, New York, the son of farmer David William Gardenier and Elizabeth Ann Benedict.

Gardenier attended the Tacomic Institute in Lanesboro, Massachusetts, the Seaside Institute in West Haven, Connecticut, and Yale Law School. He graduated from the latter school in 1871. He returned to his home town and practiced law there for the next several years in the firm Gardenier & Barrett. He later became associated with Sanford W. Smith as part of the law firm Gardenier & Smith. He worked as attorney for the New York Central Railway Company for several years. He initially practiced in Valatie, but in 1890 he moved to Chatham.

Gardenier served as District Attorney of Columbia County for three terms, beginning in 1880. In 1889, he was elected to the New York State Assembly as a Republican, representing Columbia County. He served in the Assembly in 1890, 1891, and 1895.

Gardenier was a prominent member of the Knights of Pythias, serving as Supreme Representative from the Grand Domain of New York, Supreme Master-at-Arms from 1894 to 1896, and chairman of the Judiciary Committee of the Supreme Lodge. He was also a member of the Freemasons, the Royal Arch Masonry, the Knights Templar, the Scottish Rite, and the Shriners. In 1876, he married Elizabeth Gordon Rathbone of Valatie. They had one surviving son, David W.

Gardenier died at home on June 18, 1909. He was buried in the family plot in Valatie.

References

External links 

 The Political Graveyard

1848 births
1909 deaths
People from Kinderhook, New York
People from Chatham, New York
Yale Law School alumni
19th-century American lawyers
20th-century American lawyers
County district attorneys in New York (state)
19th-century American politicians
Republican Party members of the New York State Assembly
American Freemasons
Burials in New York (state)